Dragón Rojo Jr. (Spanish for Red Dragon Jr., born November 3, 1982) is the ring name of a Mexican luchador enmascarado (Spanish for "Masked Professional wrestler") known for his work in Consejo Mundial de Lucha Libre (CMLL). Dragón Rojo Jr. has previously worked under the ring names Zaracatán Jr. and Diamante Negro but has achieved the majority of his success as Dragón Rojo Jr. He is a former CMLL World Middleweight Champion, having held the championship for a total of 1,954 days. Dragón Rojo Jr. along with Último Guerrero are the longest reigning CMLL World Tag Team Champions in the history of the championship.

Dragón Rojo Jr.'s real name is not a matter of public record as is often the case with enmascarados in Mexico who have never been unmasked; in Lucha libre it is traditional to keep masked wrestlers' private lives secret from the wrestling fans. It has not been confirmed if Dragón Rojo Jr. is in actuality the grandson of Dragón Rojo like it has been claimed of if the family relationship is pure storyline.

Personal life
The future Dragón Rojo Jr. was born on November 3, 1982 in Gómez Palacio, Durango, Mexico. While it was later claimed that he is the grand son of a professional wrestler from the 1970s called Dragón Rojo, it is believed that this is a storyline relationship only, used to explain the ring name, something not uncommon in lucha libre. Dragón Rojo Jr. has a college degree in physical education and has taught physical education at the primary school of Ejido Luján, in Gómez Palacio, Durango, inspired to become a teacher like his father. He is one of Consejo Mundial de Lucha Libre's ("World Wrestling Council; CMLL) "ambassadors" in their campaign against Tuberculosis, raising awareness and money for the fight against the disease.

Professional wrestling career
After training for two years under Raúl Díaz and Dandy Garcia he made his debut on June 28, 2001 using the name "Zaracatán Jr.", a masked técnico (good guy) ring persona. He was named the Lagunero area "Rookie of the year" for his work in the local promotion that put on shows in Torreón and Gómez Palacio in Durango. After his rookie year he suffered an injury that forced him out of wrestling for two years while recovering and rehabilitating.

When he returned to the ring he changed his ring personas and became a heel, or rudo (those that portray the bad guys), character called "Diamante Negro Jr.", soon after he'd drop the "Jr." and work as Diamante Negro. Diamante Negro stated that the five sided diamond on his mask stood for "passion, aggressiveness, strength, dedication, and professionalism" and that it was black because he was a Rúdo. As Diamante Negro he won the mask of two wrestlers in Luchas de Apuestas matches, Tackle and Guerrero both in 2007. In 2007 Diamante Negro was signed by CMLL after being invited to train with them by CMLL mainstay Último Guerrero In CMLL he worked mainly on the lower half of the card in trios matches with mixed success. In 2008 he was named as a member of "Generación del 75", a group of young wrestlers who exemplified the "CMLL future" in CMLL's 75th anniversary year. The group also included Flash, Mictlán, Tiger Kid, Hijo del Faraón, Axxel, El Hijo del Fantasma, Bronco, Metalik, Puma King, Skándalo, Súper Nova and Vangelis.

Dragón Rojo Jr.
Diamante Negro was scheduled to team with Último Guerrero in the 2008 version of CMLL's Torneo Gran Alternativa, but in July 2008 it was officially announced that he had changed names and would from then on work as "Dragón Rojo Jr.", taking the name of his grandfather "Dragón Rojo". The new gimmick and mask was noted as bearing a striking resemblance to an animated character of the same name on the show Los Campeones de la Lucha Libre. Dragón Rojo Jr. and Guerrero won the 2008 Gran Alternativa defeating the teams of Shocker and Ángel Azteca Jr., Blue Panther and Axel and in the finals defeating Dos Caras Jr. and Metalik. The win was seen as an indication that CMLL had plans to move Dragón Rojo Jr. up the card. On August 9, 2008 Dragón Rojo won his biggest "Luchas de Apuestas" match to date as he won the mask of rival Mictlán, forcing him to unmask and reveal his real name as per Lucha Libre traditions.

In December 2008 Dragón Rojo Jr. won a "#1 Contenders" match and thus earned a shot at the Mexican National Welterweight Championship held by Sangre Azteca. The title match ended in a double count out leaving Sangre Azteca the champion but showing that Dragón Rojo Jr. was not easily defeated. After the draw Dragón Rojo Jr. and Sangre Azteca began teaming together, often with Black Warrior as the third man, quickly forming a trio called Poder Mexica (Spanish for "Mexican Power").The group saw mixed success around Mexico but remained undefeated in Arena Mexico, CMLL's main venue and soon earned a shot at the Mexican National Trios Championship held by El Sagrado, La Sombra and Volador Jr. Poder Mexica won the title in their first attempt, defeating the champions on February 3, 2009. In March, 2009 Misterioso Jr. took the place of Black Warrior in several matches in Mexico City and later became an official member of Poder Mexica. At the 2009 Homenaje a Dos Leyendas show Dragón Rojo Jr. Sangre Azteca and Misteriosos Jr. lost to CMLL World Trios Champions Héctor Garza, La Máscara and El Hijo del Fantasma.

On December 19, 2009 it was announced by the Comisión de Box y Lucha Libre Mexico D.F. that Poder Mexica had been stripped of the Mexican National Trios title because Black Warrior had left CMLL, breaking up the team. At the same time they announced an eight team tournament to crown a new trios champion. The top half of the bracket took place on December 22, 2009 and the bottom half of the bracket took place on December 29. In the top bracket the team of Máscara Dorada, Stuka Jr. and Metro qualified for the finals. The bottom bracket took place on December 29, 2009 and saw Poder Mexica (Azteca, Rojo Jr. and Misterioso Jr.) defeat Fabian El Gitano, Máximo and Rouge and then Delta, Leono and Valiente to qualify for the final.

On January 6, 2010 Mascara Dorada, Stuka Jr. and Metro defeated Poder Mexica to become the new Mexican National Trios Champions. On November 2, 2010, Dragón Rojo Jr. replaced an injured Atlantis and teamed with Último Guerrero to defeat Mr. Águila and Héctor Garza for the CMLL World Tag Team Championship. After the match Rojo Jr. announced that he was leaving Poder Mexica and joining Los Guerreros de la Atlantida. On December 10 Dragón Rojo Jr. defeated Maximo, La Máscara, La Sombra and Volador Jr. in singles matches to advance to the finals of the 2010 La Copa Junior. On December 25 he defeated Averno in the finals to win the tournament.

On January 22, 2011, Dragón Rojo Jr. made his Japanese debut, when he took part in the Fantastica Mania 2011 weekend, co-promoted by CMLL and New Japan Pro-Wrestling in Tokyo. During the first night, he teamed with Tomohiro Ishii in a tag team match, where they defeated La Máscara and Tiger Mask. The following night, he, Atlantis and Taichi were defeated in a six-man tag team match by Giant Bernard, Jushin Thunder Liger and Karl Anderson. On November 18, 2011, Rojo Jr. defeated Jushin Thunder Liger to win the CMLL World Middleweight Championship, making him a double champion. On the August 3 Super Viernes show, Rojo Jr. and Guerrero lost the CMLL World Tag Team Championship to Atlantis and Diamante Azul, ending their reign at 640 days, the longest reign in the title's history.

On the September 28, 2012 CMLL Super Viernes, Rojo Jr. defeated New Japan Pro-Wrestling representative Prince Devitt to win the NWA World Historic Middleweight Championship, making him a double middleweight champion. Following the win, Rojo Jr. quit Los Guerreros del Infierno to form a team with Rey Escorpión.

Los Revolucionarios del Terror
The team of Rey Escorpión, Dragón Rojo Jr. and Pólvora was unveiled as Los Revolucionarios del Terror ("The Revolutionaries of Terror"). In January 2013, Dragón Rojo Jr. took part in the three-day Fantastica Mania 2013 event. During the first night on January 18, he was defeated by Prince Devitt in a non-title singles match. The following night, Rojo Jr., Tomohiro Ishii and Yoshi-Hashi defeated Bushi, Devitt and Ryusuke Taguchi in six man tag team match. During the third and final night, Dragón Rojo Jr. lost the NWA World Historic Middleweight Championship to La Sombra. Dragón Rojo Jr. was forced to team up with Niebla Roja, who was now a rival instead of a partner after the formation of Los Revolucionarios del Terror, for the 2013 Torneo Nacional de Parejas Increibles ("National Incredible Pairs Tournament") where the concept was that rivals would team up for a tag team tournament. Despite being rivals the duo managed to defeat the team of Rush and El Terrible in the first round and Blue Panther and Rey Escorpión in the second round. The team was defeated in the semi-finals by Niebla Rojo's stable leader Último Guerrero and Atlantis. On July 9, 2014, Dragón Rojo Jr. announced that due to his recent problems with his stablemates, he was leaving Los Revolucionarios del Terror and turning técnico. He returned to the rudo side on May 8, 2015, when he, Rey Escorpión and Pólvora reunited as Los Revolucionarios del Terror.

On March 25, 2017, nearly five and a half years after it started, Dragón Rojo Jr.'s reign as CMLL Middleweight Champion came to an end when he was defeated by Ángel de Oro. On January 22, 2019, Dragón Rojo Jr. wrestled in a six-man tag team match where he injured his knee and was unable to perform in the ring. In September 2020 he revealed that he had gone through four knee operations to address the problems, but was uncertain if he would ever be able to return to the ring.

Championships and accomplishments
Consejo Mundial de Lucha Libre(4)
CMLL World Middleweight Championship (2 times, current)
CMLL World Tag Team Championship (1 time) – with Último Guerrero
Mexican National Trios Championship (1 time) – with Sangre Azteca and Black Warrior
NWA World Historic Middleweight Championship (1 time)
La Copa Junior (2010)
Torneo Gran Alternativa (2008) – with Último Guerrero
CMLL "Revelation" of the year: 2009
Desastre Total Ultraviolento/DTU  Lucha Profesional Mexicana
DTU Tag Team Championship (1 time, current) - with Pólvora
Pro Wrestling Illustrated
PWI ranked him #138 of the top 500 singles wrestlers in the PWI 500 in 2014

Luchas de Apuestas record

References 

1982 births
Living people
Masked wrestlers
Mexican male professional wrestlers
Unidentified wrestlers
Professional wrestlers from Durango
People from Gómez Palacio, Durango
Mexican National Trios Champions
21st-century professional wrestlers
CMLL World Middleweight Champions
CMLL World Tag Team Champions
NWA World Historic Middleweight Champions